The Philippines women's national football team represents the Philippines in international women's football.  It is managed by the Philippine Football Federation (PFF), the governing body of football in the country.

The women's national football team of the Philippines was formalized in the 1980s. The Philippines has participated regularly in the AFC Women's Asian Cup, first participating in 1981 when the tournament was still known as the AFC Women's Championship. The Philippines hosted the tournament in 1999 in Iloilo and Bacolod. They had a hiatus from the continental tournament after taking part in 2003 with a qualification process being introduced in the 2006 edition. They returned to the AFC Women's Asian Cup in 2018 after qualifying in 2017. In that iteration of the tournament, they progressed beyond the group stage for the first time in their Asian Cup participation history. The Philippines progressed further in the 2022 edition, advancing to the semifinals and qualifying for the 2023 FIFA Women's World Cup. It will be the national team's first participation at a FIFA Women's World Cup tournament in their 42-year history.

In Southeast Asian football, the Philippine women's team won their first AFF Women's Championship title in 2022. The team had limited successes in prior editions of the championship and at the Southeast Asian Games, with their only honor being bronze medal finishes in 1985, which saw only three teams participating in the women's football event, and in 2021.

The head coach of the national team since October 2021 is Alen Stajcic and the team is currently 53rd in the women's FIFA ranking as of December 2022, their highest-ever rank to date.

History

Early years
The Philippines women's national football team was formally organized after the Philippine Ladies' Football Association (PLFA) was established in 1980 by footballer Cristina Ramos, who later became a member of the team. The Philippines took part in the 1983 Asian Women's Championship in Thailand although the tournament at the time was not sanctioned by FIFA or the Asian Football Confederation (AFC). In order for the Philippines to be eligible to participate in FIFA tournaments, the PLFA and, in extension, the women's national team would have to be an affiliate of the PFF, the Philippines' national sports association for football. The PLFA later became part of the PFF.

The Philippines was among the teams which competed in the 1985 Southeast Asian Games in Thailand, the first-ever edition of the games to host women's football. The team clinched its first podium finish in a tournament by finishing in third place. However, the football event of the tournament was only contested by two other teams, Thailand and Singapore, with the Philippines not winning a single match.

2000s
Marlon Maro, a former defender for the Philippines men's national team, coached the women's national football team as early as 2001 when he guided the national team through the 2001 Southeast Asian Games. He was head coach of the national team until 2007, coaching the Malditas for the last time at the 2007 Southeast Asian Games.

2010s

The Philippines national team participated at the 2011 AFF Women's Championship in Laos on October 16–25, after being inactive for the last 21 months.

The national team participated in a training camp in the United States in 2012. The team management scouted for players with Filipino heritage in the United States for the national team. Part of the training camp was participation in the 2012 LA Viking Cup, which saw the national team play against American club sides California Cosmos, Metro Stars, and Leon. The Malditas won the tournament by beating the California Cosmos in the final 4–3 on extra time following a 1–1 draw, earning the team their first-ever trophy, albeit in a minor tournament.

The national team attempted to qualify for the 2014 AFC Women's Asian Cup. The Philippines was grouped with Bangladesh, Iran and Thailand at the qualifiers single group stage with the winner advancing to the Asian Cup finals. The Malditas fell short of qualifying after losing to eventual group winners Thailand by a single goal despite winning convincingly over its other group opponents, Iran and Bangladesh.

At the 2013 AFF Women's Championship, the Philippines was grouped with Laos, Indonesia, hosts Myanmar, and the Japan under-23 team, who were invited to the tournament. The Philippines failed to proceed to the knockout stage after placing third in the group, with only the top two teams proceeding to the next phase of the tournament. The Malditas lost to Japan U23 and Myanmar and won against the other two teams.

At the 2013 Southeast Asian Games, the women's national football team failed to get past the group stage, losing against the two other nations grouped with the country and failing to score a single goal.

In February 2015, PFF general secretary Ed Gastanes said that the head coach position for the women's national team was vacant after its previous holder, Ernie Nierras, was not an A license coach, meaning he was not able to continue his coaching stint. Nierras led the team in his last competitive match as coach in 2013. The PFF announced in April 2015 that former footballer Buda Bautista was appointed as head coach and was first tasked to lead the team at the 2015 AFF Women's Championship. Bautista also became the first female coach of the national team. The Malditas failed to get past the group stage of the 2015 AFF Women's Championship, only winning a game against Malaysia and losing the other two matches.

Under Bautista, the Philippines qualified for the 2018 AFC Women's Asian Cup in Jordan, the first time the national team qualified for the AFC Women's Asian Cup since a qualification phase was introduced starting from the 2006 competition; prior to the inception of qualifications, the Philippines had participated in every iteration of the tournament except for three, failing to reach the knockout stages in each participation. The team finished second in their group in the qualifiers, in which each of the group's winners qualify for the Asian Cup. Jordan won the group, but since it had already qualified as hosts of the 2018 edition of the tournament, the virtue of qualification went to the group's runners-up.

In 2017, the PFF launched the "Project Jordan" task force to help the Malditas qualify for the 2019 FIFA Women's World Cup through the 2018 Asian Cup. The PFF secured major sponsorship and hired United States-based English coach, Richard Boon; an identification camp was held in the United States participated by national team players and prospects. A three-month training camp in the United States was later set up in late December 2017. In March 2018, Boon was replaced by French coach Rabah Benlarbi
as the national team held a camp at the PFF National Training Centre in Carmona, Cavite. The national team held their last camp under "Project Jordan" in Japan from March 20 to 27, 2018.

At the 2018 Asian Cup, the Philippines failed to reach the knockout stage leading to the championship, by which doing so would have resulted in automatic qualification for the 2019 World Cup. However, by finishing third in their group, the Malditas qualified for a special fifth place match, of which the winner qualifies for the World Cup; it was the first time the Philippines advanced beyond the group stage of the Asian Cup in their participation history. The country, then ranked 72nd in the FIFA Women's World Rankings, failed to qualify for the World Cup after losing 5–0 to the 16th-ranked South Korea in the fifth place match of the tournament.

The Philippines competed at the 2019 Southeast Asian Games, which was hosted at home, but were denied a bronze medal by Myanmar.

2020s

The Philippines did not play any games since the 2019 Southeast Asian Games due to the COVID-19 pandemic. Despite this, they attained their highest-ever world ranking then at 65th place by the end of 2020.

Guided by Marlon Maro, who returned as head coach of the team, the Philippines qualified for the 2022 AFC Women's Asian Cup in India after featuring in the qualifiers held in September 2021 despite almost a year of inactivity. Alen Stajcic was appointed as head coach in October 2021. At the 2022 Asian Cup group stage, they defeated Thailand 1–0, ending a 13-match losing streak against their Southeast Asian rivals. The Malditas advanced to the knockout stage for only the second time in their Asian Cup participation, beating Chinese Taipei in the quarterfinals on penalties following a 1–1 draw and qualifying for the 2023 FIFA Women's World Cup. It was the first time that the Philippines qualified for the FIFA Women's World Cup, and the first time the country qualified for a FIFA World Cup of any gender or age level. The national team also improved their Asian Cup record by reaching the semifinals of the tournament, where they lost 2–0 to South Korea. This consequently moved them 10 places up the FIFA Women's World Rankings to 54th place, setting a new peak rank. Stajcic also had his contract with the team extended to after the 2023 World Cup.

At the 2021 Southeast Asian Games in Vietnam, which was held in May 2022 due to the pandemic, the Filipinas repeated their success from the previous edition by reaching the knockout stage. Despite losing to Thailand 3–0 in the semifinals, the Philippines defeated Myanmar 2–1 to win the bronze medal in a rematch of the 2019 edition. The team achieved their best finish at the tournament in 37 years.

On June 23, 2022, the Filipinas recorded their first win on European soil after defeating Bosnia and Herzegovina 3–0 in a friendly in Brežice, Slovenia.

2022 AFF Women's Championship

The Philippines hosted the 2022 AFF Women's Championship. They secured their first-ever final appearance in a FIFA-sanctioned tournament and guaranteed a podium finish by upsetting defending champions Vietnam 4–0 in the semifinals, recording their best finish at the AFF Women's Championship yet. It also marked the Filipinas' first win against Vietnam after 16 matches against each other, who, alongside Thailand, have been their most-matched opponents in their 42-year history. The team went on to defeat Thailand 3–0 in the final, which was attended by 8,257 spectators at the Rizal Memorial Stadium in Manila, and clinched their first-ever title in any major tournament.

Road to World Cup
The Philippines is set to participate in the 2023 Pinatar Cup as part of its preparation for its maiden Women's World Cup bid. They will also play at the 2023 Southeast Asian Games in Cambodia.

Team image

Nicknames
The Philippines women's national football team has been known or nicknamed as the "Malditas". There is no direct English equivalent, but translations range from a mild swear or epithet ("damned" or "accursed" ones (female)) to respect or fear ("badasses" (female)). The nickname was adopted by the team during the 2005 Southeast Asian Games under head coach Ernest Nierras. Nierras meant the moniker to reflect the players' gutsy nature and inner fight ("palaban"), a symbol of a determined team who never gives up and whom opponents fear to face. However, as the term maldita could also be interpreted as "bratty", head coach Marlon Maro in October 2021 proposed discontinuing the nickname. Maro wanted to replace the nickname, believing the Malditas monicker to be pejorative. After Maro's departure in late 2021, the status of the proposal became unclear with members of the national team at that time preferring to keep the nickname.

In March 2022, the PFF announced that they would be officially adopting the nickname "Filipinas" for the team. The moniker had been used before, as the demonym for female people of the Philippines. Jefferson Cheng the team manager reasoned that Malditas is a swear word in Spanish and Portuguese which translates to "damned", but the derivative word has a bit more of a pejorative meaning in Tagalog and, despite its uniqueness, one could imagine it to be "problematic" having to repeatedly explain its meaning. Cheng also said that the Filipinas moniker is a standalone and is not meant to be preceded by a modifier (e.g. Philippine Filipinas).

Home stadium
The earliest recorded home matches of the Philippines women's national team were held at the Iloilo Sports Complex, it was during the 1999 AFC Women's Championship when the country hosted the tournament. The national team also held official international matches at the PhilSports Football and Athletics Stadium and Moro Lorenzo Football Field. In October 2015, a Memorandum of Understanding was signed by the Philippine Football Federation and the local government of Biñan, allowing the national team to use the Biñan Football Stadium as their home stadium for the next four years. The national team has recently played the majority of its matches at the Rizal Memorial Stadium in Manila, which is commonly referred as the country's national stadium.

FIFA World Ranking
, after the match against . Only matches against senior national teams are counted.

 Best Ranking   Best Mover   Worst Ranking   Worst Mover

Results and fixtures

The following is a list of match results in the last 12 months, as well as any future matches that have been scheduled.

2022

2023

Head-to-head record
, after the match against .

Personnel
Updated as of July 22, 2022

Current technical staff

Management

Coaching history

Notes

Players

Current squad
Caps and goals updated as of February 19, 2023, after the match against .

Recent call-ups

The following players have been called up for the Philippines within the past 12 months.

COV Withdrew due to COVID-19 
INJ Withdrew due to an injury 
PRE Included in the preliminary squad 
RET Retired from the national team 
SUS Serving suspension

Previous squads

Competitive record

FIFA Women's World Cup

The Philippines had never qualified for the FIFA Women's World Cup until the 2023 edition. It did not attempt to qualify for the inaugural FIFA Women's World Cup in 1991 with its non-participation at the 1991 AFC Women's Championship, which served as the Asian qualifiers of the World Cup. The national team first attempted to qualify for the succeeding editions of the tournament from 1995 except for the 2011 edition.

*Draws include knockout matches decided on penalty kicks.

Olympic Games
The Philippines entered a qualification tournament for the Olympics. At the first two editions of the Olympics where women's football was played, the standings at the preceding FIFA Women's World Cup were used. With the country failing to qualify for the final tournament of the 1995 and 1999 FIFA Women's World Cups the country failed to qualify for the 1996 and 2000 Olympics.

AFC Women's Asian Cup

Asian Games

AFF Women's Championship

SEA Games

Minor tournaments

*Draws include knockout matches decided on penalty kicks.

See also

Women's association football around the world
Sport in the Philippines
Football in the Philippines
Women's football in the Philippines

Women's
Philippines women's national under-20 football team

Men's
Philippines men's national football team
Philippines national under-23 football team
Philippines national under-21 football team
Philippines national under-19 football team
Philippines national under-17 football team

References

External links
 Official website 
 FIFA profile 
 

 
Women's football in the Philippines
Asian women's national association football teams